Guangdong Country Garden School (CGS), is a private co-ed boarding school in Shunde District, Foshan City, just south of Guangzhou, in the People's Republic of China. CGS has a campus area of 33 hectares with more than 3,500 students on campus.

History

CGS was founded in 1994, and was the first school established within Bright Scholar Education Group. CGS added IB Diploma Programme (International Baccalaureate) in 2001, and A-level (General Certificate of Education Advanced Level) and IGCSE programs (International General Certificate of Secondary Education) in 2007.

Academic reputation

CGS has been a member of the International Baccalaureate for many years and has successfully completed 5 Year Programme Evaluations at the PYP (2011), MYP (2015), and DP levels (2011).

References 

Boarding schools in China
Buildings and structures in Foshan
International schools in Guangdong
International Baccalaureate schools in China
Shunde District